Mohammad Talha (born 15 October 1988) is a Pakistani cricketer. He is a right-arm fast-medium bowler. He has gained an increasing reputation in Pakistani for quick bowling, eventually leading to selection for the international squad for the February 2009 test series against Sri Lanka.

Domestic career
Though relatively inexperienced, he was first noticed in 2005 Afro-Asia Cup playing for the Pakistan U-19s, able to extract bounce and sharp burst of speed. However, injuries limited his performance in the following year. His performance in the 2008–09 Quaid-e-Azam Trophy gained him recognition, playing for National Bank of Pakistan. Alongside a fellow young pace newcomer Mohammad Aamer, he gained his first ten-wicket haul against Pakistan Customs side, taking 10 for 119 in the match. Halfway through the season, he had 34 wickets in six games.

He worked extensively with Aaqib Javaid at the National Cricket Academy based in Karachi, where he slightly re-modified his action to avoid persistent injuries. Javaid said of Talha that he believed him to be close to national team selection and that he was the fastest bowler in Pakistan after Shoaib Akhtar.

In an interview, Talha commented on his desire to be known as a genuine fast bowler and to represent Pakistan at the highest level, "I want to be a 145kp/h+ bowler. I dont want to get slower, I just want to get faster and faster."

In the home test series against Sri Lanka in 2009, he was chosen for the 15-man squad for both the first and second test. For the first test he was overlooked for pacemen Sohail Khan and all-rounder Yasir Arafat.

Early career and personal life

Talha grew up in Faisalabad, where he began playing tape ball cricket, encouraged by his elder brother. Talha has a daughter named Rumaan and lives in Hajia Bad. He received his early education from the Government School in Hajia Bab. In 2003, he went for the Under-16s trial in the Faisalabad region and was selected but admits to not having the stamina at the time for longer version of the game. He has said that, like many young Pakistani bowlers of the current era, Wasim Akram and Waqar Younis were his cricketing idols whilst growing up and also added that Brett Lee was also someone he tried to learn from. He has modeled his bowling action on that Lee's.

International career

Talha made his test debut against Sri Lanka on 1 March 2009. Although he failed to impress after bowling 17 overs, he gave away 88 runs and took the wicket of M. Muralitharan, who was batting at number 9. The match was cancelled due to an attack on the Sri Lankan team. He was recalled to the Pakistan team in 2014 to play again against Sri Lanka. This time, he bowled brilliantly and took wickets in both innings. He made his ODI debut against India and bowled well, taking 2 for 22 in 7 overs. In the next two games, he gave away 1–68 in 7 overs against Bangladesh and 1–56 in 6.2 overs against Sri Lanka in the final. He was a part of Pakistan's 2014 ICC World Twenty 20 tournament squad but had to sit on the bench during the whole tournament.

References

External links
 

1988 births
Living people
Pakistan Test cricketers
Pakistan One Day International cricketers
Faisalabad cricketers
Port Qasim Authority cricketers
National Bank of Pakistan cricketers
Bahawalpur cricketers
Faisalabad Wolves cricketers
Punjab (Pakistan) cricketers
Cricketers from Faisalabad